This article summarizes the events, album releases, and album release dates in hip hop music for the year 2022.

Events

January
On January 1, Kodak Black was arrested in Pompano Beach, Florida, on trespassing charges, twelve months after Donald Trump pardoned him.
On January 2, Traxamillion died at the age of 42.
On January 11, Justin Johnson and Shondale Barnett, Young Dolph's killers, were arrested in Indiana; the same day, Cornelius Smith, another of Dolph's killers, was indicted on a first-degree murder charge.
On January 13, CPO Boss Hogg died at the age of 52.
On January 14, Sad Frosty died at the age of 24. That same day, rap group Brockhampton announced that they were splitting up after a performance at Coachella 2022.
 On January 26, NBA YoungBoy's Texas home was raided by SWAT team.
 On January 31, it was announced that Yo Gotti would be releasing his last album CM10: Free Game.

February
On February 8, Nelly apologizes for posting his sex tape on social media.
On February 9, it was announced that Snoop Dogg would be the new owner of Death Row Records.
 On February 10, it was announced that Mozzy would be signed to Collective Music Group.
 On February 12, Blueface was arrested for gun possession in Hollywood, California. The same day, Kodak Black was shot after a fight at a Justin Bieber party in Los Angeles, California, and Kanye West berates Pete Davidson, Kid Cudi, Billie Eilish and Taylor Swift on Instagram.
 On February 13, Dr. Dre, Eminem, Kendrick Lamar, Mary J. Blige, and Snoop Dogg performed at the Super Bowl LVI halftime show at SoFi Stadium in Inglewood, California. 50 Cent and Anderson .Paak also made appearances during the performance.
 On February 14, Kanye West and his girlfriend Julia Fox broke up. Fox later revealed their relationship was a publicity stunt and she was never in love with him.
 On February 18, it was announced that Pusha T had squashed his beef with Drake.
 On February 22, Kanye West held his Donda 2 listening party. That same day, 600 Breezy was released from prison.
 On February 23, South African-native rapper, singer, and songwriter Riky Rick died by suicide at the age of 34.
 On February 26, American rapper Snootie Wild died after being shot in Houston, Texas, at the age of 36. The same day, True Bleeda was shot and killed in Baton Rouge, Louisiana.

March
 On March 6, DJ Dimplez, South African native hip hop DJ and producer died.

April
 On April 3, Baby Keem and Kendrick Lamar won the Best Rap Performance for their song "Family Ties" at the 64th Annual Grammy Awards. Kanye West won both Best Rap Song and Best Melodic Rap Performance for his two respective songs, "Jail" featuring Jay-Z, and "Hurricane" featuring The Weeknd and Lil Baby. Tyler, the Creator won the Grammy for Best Rap Album with Call Me If You Get Lost.
 On April 4, Tory Lanez was re-arrested for violating a court order regarding a 2020 shooting incident with Megan Thee Stallion. It was alleged he mentioned her on social media, which was considered a violation.
 On April 17, DJ Kay Slay died at the age of 55 due to COVID-19 complications.
 On April 20, ASAP Rocky was arrested in Los Angeles, California in connection to a shooting.

May
 On May 2, Rod Wave was arrested for battery in St. Petersburg, Florida.
 On May 9, Young Thug, Gunna, and 26 others associated  with YSL were arrested for R.I.C.O. and conspiracy charges in Fulton County, Atlanta, Georgia.
 On May 13, Lil Keed died at the age of 24 due to kidney failure. That same day, Kendrick Lamar released Mr. Morale & the Big Steppers, his fifth studio album and first release since 2017's Damn.
 On May 29, Sidhu Moose Wala was shot and killed at the age of 28 in Mansa, Punjab, India.

June
 On June 2, the trial against Eric Holder Jr. for the murder of Nipsey Hussle has begun after Holder being arrested April 2, 2019.
 On June 3, British rapper Hypo was murdered in Woodford Green, London.
 On June 5, Atlanta-based rapper Trouble was shot and killed at the age of 34. It was also reported that Washington DC-based rapper 23 Rackz was also fatally shot.
 On June 14, XXL released their 2022 Freshman Class, including Nardo Wick, Doechii, SoFaygo, Babyface Ray, Kali, KayCyy, Cochise, Big30, KenTheMan, Big Scarr, Saucy Santana, and BabyTron.
 On June 22, Lil Tjay was critically shot in Edgewater, New Jersey, but survived.
 On June 29, R. Kelly was sentenced to 30 years in prison.

July
 On July 3, it was announced that Big Sean and Jhené Aiko would be expecting their first child together.
 On July 6, Eric Holder Jr. was convicted on first-degree murder charges for the murder of Nipsey Hussle after Holder’s trial had started on June 2.
 On July 27, JayDaYoungan was shot and killed at the age of 24.

August
 On August 15, Nipsey Hussle received a Hollywood Walk of Fame star posthumously, on what would have been his 37th birthday.
 On August 18, Dr. Dre and Jimmy Iovine opened a new high school in Leimert Park, California.
 On August 19, Quando Rondo was targeted in a shooting at a Mobil gas station in Beverly Hills. He was not injured.

September 
 On September 4, Pat Stay was fatally stabbed at the age of 36 in downtown Halifax, Nova Scotia.
 On September 12, PnB Rock was fatally shot at the age of 30 at a Roscoe's Chicken and Waffles restaurant in Los Angeles, California.
 On September 25, it was announced Rihanna would be headlining the Halftime show at Super Bowl LVII at State Farm Stadium.
 On September 28, Coolio died from a heart attack at the age of 59.
 On September 29, Freddie Lee Trone was arrested for the murder of PnB Rock in Las Vegas, Nevada, along with 2 other people.

October
 On October 7, Kanye West's Instagram account was locked following antisemitic remarks directed at Diddy.
 On October 8, Kanye West posted a tweet saying that he was "going death con 3" on Jewish people.
 On October 11, Vice reported on unaired segments of an interview of Kanye West by Tucker Carlson on Fox News, which contained West making several conspiratorial, racist and antisemitic statements.
 On October 13, Fat Joe squashed his beef with Irv Gotti.
 On October 26, Tory Lanez was placed on house arrest after an altercation with August Alsina.

November
 On November 1, Takeoff was fatally shot in Houston, Texas, at the age of 28.
 On November 5, Eminem was inducted into the Rock and Roll Hall of Fame. He was presented by Dr. Dre, and had special guest appearances by Aerosmith lead vocalist Steven Tyler and Ed Sheeran during his performance.
 On November 14, Rich the Kid was signed to RCA Records.
 On November 15, Blueface was arrested for attempted murder.
 On November 27, Ty Dolla $ign was injured in a skateboarding accident.

December
 On December 12, the trial began for Tory Lanez against Megan Thee Stallion after allegedly shooting her in the foot in July 2020.
 On December 14, Gunna was released from prison after being arrested in May 2022.
 On December 19, Pusha T stepped down as president of GOOD Music after a seven-year tenure and left the label.
 On December 22, Big Scarr passed away in his hometown of Memphis, Tennessee, at the age of 22 from a drug overdose.
 On December 23, Tory Lanez was convicted on all charges for the shooting of Megan Thee Stallion after his trial began on December 12. Lanez faces a maximum prison sentence of 22 years and eight months.

Released albums

January

February

March

April

May

June

July

August

September

October

November

December

Highest-charting songs

Highest first-week consumption

All critically reviewed albums ranked

Metacritic

See also
 Previous article: 2021 in hip hop music
 Next article: 2023 in hip hop music

References

Hip hop music by year
hip hop